Diandra Tchatchouang (born 14 June 1991) is a French basketball player for CJM Bourges Basket. She has played the Euroleague with Basket Lattes, and in June 2012 she made her debut for the French national team. She is 1.87 meters tall and plays as a forward.

References

External links

1991 births
Living people
Basketball players at the 2020 Summer Olympics
French expatriate basketball people in the United States
French women's basketball players
Maryland Terrapins women's basketball players
Medalists at the 2020 Summer Olympics
Olympic basketball players of France
Olympic bronze medalists for France
Olympic medalists in basketball
People from Villepinte, Seine-Saint-Denis
San Antonio Silver Stars draft picks
Small forwards
Sportspeople from Seine-Saint-Denis